Halford IV: Made of Metal is the fourth studio album by the heavy metal band Halford, the solo project of Judas Priest frontman Rob Halford. It was produced by Roy Z and recorded during 2009 and 2010. The album was released on September 28, 2010. Singles from the album include "The Mower" and "Made of Metal", for which an animated video was made.

Track listing
All songs arranged by Rob Halford, Roy Z.

Personnel
Halford
 Rob Halford – vocals
 Roy Z – guitar
 Metal Mike Chlasciak – guitar
 Mike Davis – bass guitar
 Bobby Jarzombek – drums

Additional performer
Ed Roth – keyboards

Production
Produced and engineered by Roy Z
Executive producer – John Baxter
Mixed by Pete Martinez
Sound design by John Mattox
Mastered by Maor Appelbaum
Graphic direction, marketing, and web design by Attila Juhasz
Booklet art by Dean Wright
Photography by Eddie Malluk and John Baxter

References

2010 albums
Halford (band) albums
Albums produced by Roy Z